Thread (formerly known as Incentive Mentoring Program or IMP) is a 501(c)(3) non-profit organization that was founded by Sarah and Ryan Hemminger as a partnership between students at Johns Hopkins University and two Baltimore City High Schools: Paul Laurence Dunbar High School (Baltimore, Maryland) and the Academy for College and Career Exploration . The goal of Thread is to transform teenagers who are failing high school into Baltimore City's most valuable role models. Thread extends a school-based tutoring program to the home, providing both academic and social support to youth struggling with poverty, drugs, and violence. Mentoring teams, called "Thread Families" not only support teenagers in overcoming their own adversity, but also encourage them to help others do the same.  The first group of Thread students achieved a 100% graduation and 100% college enrollment rate.

Target participants
Thread's philosophy is that its mentors should learn just as much from the high-school students as these teenagers learn from them.

Teenagers
High School freshman who have failed at least 50% of their courses and face one of the following psychosocial challenges are selected to join Thread and receive support through college graduation.
  School Suspension 
  Substance Abuse 
  Gang Violence
  Sexual Assault
  Poverty
  Temporary Homelessness
  Burdensome Financial Obligation to Household
  Learning Disability
  Depression
  Incarcerated Parent

Health professionals in training
Thread's mentors are medical, public health, and nursing students who personally witness the challenges teenagers face. These future health professionals develop experience with urban health issues and promoting behavior change.

Mentoring model
Thread has a "family style" mentoring, in which a team of 5-6 mentors is matched with each child and is responsible for adapting to his/her unique needs.
Thread Families coach life skills through activities based on 3 elements: academic assistance, community service, and team-building. As needed, these teams connect students and their families with rehabilitation and other social services. This model was designed to meet the comprehensive needs of the students without overburdening volunteers.

Academic assistance
Mentors serve as tutors, advocates, and counselors for students. Johns Hopkins graduate students hold 1-on-1 after-school tutoring sessions twice weekly. Volunteers also coach organizational skills, seek regular feedback from teachers, and navigate the college application and financial aid processes.

Community service
At first, the primary concern of many Thread students is self-preservation. Their perspectives shift when they are put in the position of giving to others. Thread Alumni say that participating in service projects gave them a sense of purpose and hope for the future.

Team-building
Thread encourages students to rely on each other as well as their network of mentors. Field trips such as camping and high-ropes courses are designed to develop trust, communication skills, and problem solving ability.

Community service awards
Thread has received service awards from both local and national organizations.

Echoing Green Fellowship Semifinalist 2008
  Baltimore Albert Schweitzer Fellowship 2004,2005,2006,2008
  SOURCE School of Medicine Individual Community Service Award presented to mentors in 2005, 2007
  Martin Luther King Junior Community Service Award 2006
  Boy Scouts of America, Scoutreach Whitney M Young Jr. National Service Award
  Spirit of Scouting Leadership Award 2007

Community service partnerships
Thread mentors and students participate side-by-side in monthly community service projects benefiting organizations throughout Maryland.
  Maryland Food Bank
  New Life for Girls
  The Club at Collington Square Middle School
  Bluford Drew Jemison Academy
  St. Francis Academy Community Center
  Johns Hopkins SOURCE (Student Outreach Resource Center)

References

External links
Incentive Mentoring Program

Charities based in Maryland